The former First Church of Christ, Scientist, located at 128 East Adams Street, in Sandusky, Ohio, in the United States is an historic structure that on October 20, 1982, was added to the National Register of Historic Places. The building is now Emmanuel Temple Church.

Current use
First Church of Christ, Scientist, Sandusky, is no longer in existence. Emmanuel Temple Church, affiliated with the Pentecostal Assemblies of the World (PAW), now worships in the building. The Rev. Rufus G. W. Sanders, Ph.D.,  bishop of the PAW, is the founding pastor, of Emmanuel Temple Church.

See also
List of Registered Historic Places in Erie County, Ohio
List of former Christian Science churches, societies and buildings
 First Church of Christ, Scientist (disambiguation)

References

External links
 National Register listings for Erie County, Ohio

National Register of Historic Places in Erie County, Ohio
Churches completed in 1922
20th-century Christian Science church buildings
Churches in Sandusky, Ohio
Churches on the National Register of Historic Places in Ohio
Former Christian Science churches, societies and buildings in Ohio
Churches in Erie County, Ohio